Camarotea is a genus of flowering plants belonging to the family Acanthaceae.

Its native range is Madagascar.

Species:

Camarotea souiensis

References

Acanthaceae
Acanthaceae genera